The 2007–08 season was Coventry City's 88th season in The Football League and their 7th consecutive season in the Football League Championship. Along with competing in the Championship, the club also participated in the FA Cup and Football League Cup. The season covers the period from 1 July 2007 to 30 June 2008.

Review and events

Monthly events
This is a list of the significant events to occur at the club during the 2007–08 season, presented in chronological order. This list does not include transfers, which are listed in the transfers section below, or match results, which are in the results section.

August:
 Iain Dowie is named Championship Manager of the Month.
September:
 Tribunal sets the prices for Gary Borrowdale and Leon Best.
 £650,000 upfront for Best, rising to a maximum of £1,200,000.
 £400,000 upfront for Borrowdale, rising to a maximum of £650,000.
October:
 Managing Director Paul Fletcher announces his resignation.
 Acting Chairman Geoffrey Robinson MP stands down with Joe Elliott taking his place.
 Transfer embargo installed due to failure to pay installment on Leon Best transfer.
November
 Potential takeover by Ray Ranson fronted SISU consortium hits an alleged financial stumbling block.
December
 With less than an hour before deadline, takeover by Ray Ranson fronted SISU consortium goes through.
 Club and new owners SISU file intent to go into administration as a precaution.
January
 Transfer embargo imposed in October is lifted.
February
 Iain Dowie is sacked as manager, with John Harbin and Frankie Bunn taking over as caretaker managers.
 Chris Coleman is appointed as new manager, with Steve Kean coming in as his assistant
 SISU acquire the 90% ownership of the club required to complete their takeover.
March
 Scott Dann and Daniel Fox are both called up into the England Under-21 squad for first time.
April
 Jay Tabb is voted the official Fans' Players of the Season, while Leon Best picks up Young Player Award.
May
 Coventry City escape relegation on the last day of the season despite 4–1 defeat to Charlton Athletic.

Matches

Pre-season friendlies

Championship

League Cup

FA Cup

Season statistics

Appearances and goals

|}
Notes:
 Player substitutions are not included.

Goalscorers
 14 players have scored for the Coventry City first team during the 2007–08 season.
 66 goals were scored in total during the 2007–08 season.
 52 in the Championship
 8 in the League Cup
 6 in the FA Cup
 The top goalscorer was Michael Mifsud with 17 goals.

Yellow cards

 24 players have been booked for the Coventry City first team during the 2007–08 season.
 90 bookings were received in total during the 2007–08 season.
 47 in the Championship
 3 in the League Cup
 2 in the FA Cup
 The most booked player was Leon Best with 11 cards.

Red cards
 3 players have been sent off for the Coventry City first team during the 2007–08 season.
 4 players were sent off in total during the 2007–08 season.
 4 in the Championship
 0 in the League Cup
 0 in the FA Cup
 The most sent off player was Kevin Kyle with 2 sending offs.

Transfers

Transfers In

Transfers Out

Loans In

Loans Out

Kit profile

|
|
|}

References

External links
 Official Site: 2007/2008 Fixtures & Results
 BBC Sport – Club Stats
 Soccerbase – Results | Squad Stats | Transfers

Coventry City F.C. seasons
Coventry City